Tuarangisaurus ( "ancient" +  "lizard") is an extinct genus of elasmosaurid known from New Zealand. The type and only known species is Tuarangisaurus keyesi, named by Wiffen and Moisley in 1986.

Discovery
 
Tuarangisaurus is known from the holotype NZGS CD425, a nearly complete skull and mandible, and from NZGS CD426, nine anterior-most cervical vertebrae. Some postcranial remains of juveniles were also attributed to Tuarangisaurus, with one specimen (NZGS CD427) containing at least 30 gastroliths. It was collected from the Maungataniwha Sandstone Member of the Tahora Formation, dating to the upper Campanian to lower Maastrichtian stage of the Late Cretaceous.

A second species, T. australis, was named in 2005;  however, it was moved to the genus Eromangasaurus in 2007, becoming the senior synonym of E. carinognathus. A third species, T.? cabazai, was also referred to Tuarangisaurus by the original description; however, it was most recently reassigned to an indeterminate aristonectine.

In 2017, a complete specimen (CM Zfr 115), originally belonging to Mauisaurus, has been reassigned to this genus. In 2018, Otero and colleagues reported a juvenile specimen which indicated the ontogeny of this plesiosaur. The specimen had many features common with the holotype, but it differed in the orientation of the maxilla along with the number of teeth present in it.

Description
It can be distinguished from all other known elasmosaurids by a unique combination of characteristics as well as two otherwise unknown traits: the ectopterygoid has a long process directed towards the back, and a large boss of bone underneath. A stapes is present in the holotype; this bone was previously thought to be absent from elasmosaurids.

Classification
Tuarangisaurus was initially assigned to the Elasmosauridae; one study found it to be a close relative of Callawayasaurus. A new phylogenetic analysis of plesiosaurs in 2016 reaffirmed that Tuarangisaurus was an elasmosaurid, but rejected a close relationship with Callawayasaurus. Its position within the Elasmosauridae according to this analysis is shown below.

See also

 List of plesiosaur genera
 Timeline of plesiosaur research

References

Late Cretaceous plesiosaurs
Extinct reptiles of New Zealand
Fossil taxa described in 1986
Elasmosaurids
Plesiosaurs of Oceania
Sauropterygian genera